DEFCAD, Inc. is an American startup that has created a search engine and web portal for designers and hobbyists to find and develop 3D printable and other CAD models online.

History

Founding

When Makerbot Industries removed firearms-related 3D Printable files at the public repository Thingiverse in December 2012, open source software entrepreneurs launched DEFCAD as a companion site to publicly host the removed files.
Public and community submissions to DEFCAD rose quickly, and in March 2013, at the SXSW Interactive festival, DEFCAD was announced as a repurposed and expanded site that would serve as a 3D search engine and development hub.

DEFCAD has been called "The Pirate Bay of 3D Printing" and "the anti-Makerbot".

Community

DEFCAD began as a repository where users could upload and download CAD models, but quickly became a community with the addition of an IRC channel and public forums. The site has had over 2,500 community users and offered access to over 100,000 models in its history.

Search

In August 2013, DEFCAD released the public alpha of its 3D search engine, which indexes public object repositories and allows users to add their own objects.  The site soon closed down due to pressure from the United States State Department, under the pretense that distributing certain files online might violate US Arms Export ITAR regulations.  

From 2013 to 2018, DEFCAD remained offline, pending resolution to the legal case Defense Distributed brought against the State Department, namely that ITAR regulations placed a prior restraint on Defense Distributed's free speech, particularly since the speech in question regarded another constitutionally protected right: firearms.  While the legal argument failed to gain support in federal court, in a surprise reversal in 2018, the State Department agreed that ITAR did in fact violate Defense Distributed's free speech.  Therefore, for a brief period in late 2018 DEFCAD was once again publicly available online.

Shortly thereafter, 20 states and Washington DC sued the State Department, in order to prevent DEFCAD from remaining online.  At its core, this new suit cited a procedural error: the proper notice had not been given prior to enacting the change in how ITAR applied to small arms.  As such, DEFCAD was once again taken offline, pending the State Department providing proper notice via the Federal Register.  

In March 2020, the Wall Street Journal reported that DEFCAD had once again became publicly available online. The site had implemented a new model in which people who wished to download firearms blueprints would be charged $50 and vetted to ensure they were located within the United States and that they were citizens or legal residents.

See also 
 Ghost gun

References

External links
 DEFCAD Website
 DEFCAD Forums (defunct, archived)
 DEFCAD IRC

Weapon development
Online companies of the United States
Free software companies